Qidong railway station (Chinese: 祁东站) is a railway station in Qidong County, Hengyang, Hunan, China.

Initially, this station was called Qidong South. In January 2013, its name was changed to Qidong and the existing Qidong railway station was renamed Qidong North railway station. The station opened with the Hengyang–Liuzhou intercity railway on 28 December 2013.

References

Railway stations in Hunan
Railway stations in China opened in 2013